Caulerpa lamourouxii is a species of seaweed in the Caulerpaceae family.

The species is usually found in shallow waters in sandy substrata in tropical waters of the Indian Ocean and the Red Sea. In Western Australia, it is found along the coast from Kimberley, through the Pilbara and south as far as Ningaloo reef in the Gascoyne region of Western Australia. and east into Northern Territory waters.

References

lamourouxii
Species described in 1817